Andrzej Kowal (born 27 February 1971) is a Polish professional volleyball coach and former player.

Personal life
Kowal was born in Nowa Sarzyna, Poland. He has a wife Magdalena and two children – son Michał and daughter Monika.

Career as coach
In 2011 he was a head coach of Asseco Resovia. In season 2011/2012 he achieved a title of Polish Champion and silver medal of CEV Cup. In season 2012/2013 his team won the second title of Polish Champion. In February 2014 he became a head coach of Polish national team B (under 23). In 2014 his club Asseco Resovia lost with PGE Skra Bełchatów in the final of Polish Championship. On 29 March 2015 his team lost in the final of 2014–15 CEV Champions League and achieved silver medal. In April 2015 he led the team to their third title of Polish Champion. In April 2015 he signed new three-year contract with Asseco Resovia. Polish national team led by him took 4th place at 1st edition of 2015 European Games. On 14 August 2015 the same team achieved a bronze medal of the European League.

Honours

As a coach
 CEV Champions League
  2014/2015 – with Asseco Resovia
 CEV Cup
  2011/2012 – with Asseco Resovia
 National championships
 2011/2012  Polish Championship, with Asseco Resovia
 2012/2013  Polish SuperCup, with Asseco Resovia
 2012/2013  Polish Championship, with Asseco Resovia
 2014/2015  Polish Championship, with Asseco Resovia

References

External links

 
 Coach Profile at Volleybox.net

1971 births
Living people
People from Leżajsk County
Polish men's volleyball players
Polish volleyball coaches
Volleyball coaches of international teams
Polish expatriate sportspeople in Romania
Resovia (volleyball) players
Resovia (volleyball) coaches
Ślepsk Suwałki coaches